Newville is a hamlet in the town of Danube, in Herkimer County, New York, United States.

It is the location of the Zoller-Frasier Round Barn, built c.1895, which is listed on the National Register of Historic Places.

References

Hamlets in Herkimer County, New York
Hamlets in New York (state)